Wangyuehu station is a subway station in Changsha, Hunan, China, operated by the Changsha subway operator Changsha Metro.

Station layout
The station has one island platform.

History
Construction began on December 31, 2014 and it was completed in June 2018. The station opened on 26 May 2019.

Surrounding area
 Wangyuehu No. 1 School
 Meixi River
 Wangyuehu village

References

Railway stations in Hunan
Railway stations in China opened in 2019